Michael Fuchs (born 22 April 1982) is a retired international level badminton player from Germany.

Michael Fuchs concentrates on doubles badminton competing with Johannes Schöttler in Men's and with Birgit Michels in the Mixed event. Fuchs and Michels have risen as high as sixth in the world rankings for their event.  At the 2012 Summer Olympics, Fuchs and Michels reached the quarter finals.

Achievements

European Championships 
Men's doubles

BWF Superseries 
The BWF Superseries, which was launched on 14 December 2006 and implemented in 2007, was a series of elite badminton tournaments, sanctioned by the Badminton World Federation (BWF). BWF Superseries levels were Superseries and Superseries Premier. A season of Superseries consisted of twelve tournaments around the world that had been introduced since 2011. Successful players were invited to the Superseries Finals, which were held at the end of each year.

Mixed doubles

  BWF Superseries Premier tournament
  BWF Superseries tournament

BWF Grand Prix 
The BWF Grand Prix had two levels, the Grand Prix and Grand Prix Gold. It was a series of badminton tournaments sanctioned by the Badminton World Federation (BWF) and played between 2007 and 2017. The World Badminton Grand Prix was sanctioned by the International Badminton Federation from 1983 to 2006.

Men's doubles

Mixed doubles

  BWF Grand Prix Gold tournament
  BWF / IBF Grand Prix tournament

BWF International Challenge/Series 
Men's doubles

Mixed doubles

  BWF International Challenge tournament
  BWF International Series tournament
  BWF Future Series tournament

Record Against Selected Opponents
Mixed Doubles results with Birgit Michels against Super Series finalists, Worlds Semi-finalists, and Olympic quarterfinalists.

  Zhang Nan & Zhao Yunlei 0–9
  Xu Chen & Ma Jin 0–5
  Qiu Zihan & Bao Yixin 0–1
  Liu Cheng & Bao Yixin 1–1
  Chen Hung-ling & Cheng Wen-hsing 2–1
  Lee Sheng-mu & Chien Yu-chin 2–0
  Joachim Fischer Nielsen & Christinna Pedersen 1–4
  Thomas Laybourn & Kamilla Rytter Juhl 2–2
  Chris Adcock & Gabby Adcock 1–3
  Chris Adcock & Imogen Bankier 1–0
  Lee Chun Hei & Chau Hoi Wah 1–1
  Tantowi Ahmad & Liliyana Natsir 2–5
  Riky Widianto & Puspita Richi Dili 0–1
  Lee Yong-dae & Ha Jung-eun 0–2
  Ko Sung-hyun & Ha Jung-eun 0–1
  Ko Sung-hyun & Kim Ha-na 3–3
  Yoo Yeon-seong & Chang Ye-na 2–0
  Chan Peng Soon & Goh Liu Ying 1–3
  Robert Mateusiak & Nadieżda Zięba 1–1
  Sudket Prapakamol & Saralee Thungthongkam 1–5

References

External links
 

1982 births
Living people
Sportspeople from Würzburg
German male badminton players
Badminton players at the 2012 Summer Olympics
Badminton players at the 2016 Summer Olympics
Olympic badminton players of Germany